Ficus rubra (aka red affouche or affouche rouge) is a species of flowering plant in the family of Moraceae, native to some islands in the Indian Ocean.

It is found in Madagascar, Comoros, Réunion, Mauritius and Seychelles. It also has been introduced to Kauai island (Hawaiʻi).

Pollinator of this plant is the wasp Nigeriella avicola  Wiebes.

On Kauai island, Port Jackson fig wasps (Pleistodontes imperialis) are able to do the job as substitute pollinators.

References

External links

rubra
Taxa named by Martin Vahl
Plants described in 1805